Ronald "Ron" Morgan (born 21 January 1936) is an English-born Welsh rugby union, and professional rugby league footballer who played in the 1960s and 1970s.

Background
Ron Morgan was born in Bradford, West Riding of Yorkshire, England, he has Welsh ancestors, and eligible to play for Wales due to the grandparent rule.

Playing career

International honours
Ron Morgan won caps for Wales (RL) while at Leeds in 1963 against England, and won caps for Great Britain (RL) while at Swinton in 1963 against France and Australia; With Leeds in 1968 against France, and New Zealand.

County honours
Ron Morgan won one cap for Yorkshire (RL) while at Swinton in 1963–64 season.

Championships appearances
Ron Morgan played in Swinton's victories in the Championship during the 1962–63 season and the 1963–64 season

County Cup Final appearances
Ron Morgan played right-, i.e. number 10, and was sent-off in Swinton's 4–7 defeat by St. Helens in the 1962–63 Lancashire County Cup Final during the 1962–63 season at Central Park, Wigan on Saturday 27 October 1962.

Club career
Ron Morgan made his début for Swinton, and scored a hat-trick of tries against Liverpool Stanley on Saturday 7 October 1961, and he was transferred from Swinton to Leeds Rhinos for a transfer fee of £4500  (based on increases in average earnings, this would be approximately £218,900 in 2017),

Genealogical information
Ron Morgan is the son of the rugby union and rugby league footballer; Bill Morgan, and the nephew of a rugby league footballer who played for Wigan (Heritage No.).

References

External links
!Great Britain Statistics at englandrl.co.uk (statistics currently missing due to not having appeared for both Great Britain, and England)

1936 births
Living people
Ebbw Vale RFC players
English people of Welsh descent
English rugby league players
English rugby union players
Footballers who switched code
Great Britain national rugby league team players
Leeds Rhinos players
Rugby league players from Bradford
Rugby league props
Rugby league second-rows
Rugby league utility players
Rugby union players from Bradford
Swinton Lions players
Wales national rugby league team players